Statistics of Belgian First Division in the 1975–76 season.

Overview

It was contested by 19 teams, and Club Brugge K.V. won the championship.
At the end of the season the division was reduced in size from 19 to 18 clubs, so three clubs were relegated to Division II to be replaced by two promoted clubs.

League standings

Results

References

Belgian Pro League seasons
Belgian
1975–76 in Belgian football